Pop'n'Gum is the second studio album by French power pop group Superbus. It reached the 26th place on French album charts. It was released in June 2004.

Its first single, Radio Song, is a playable bonus song on Guitar Hero III: Legends of Rock.

Track listing
 "Radio Song" – 2:24 
 "Pop'n'Gum" – 2:15
 "Des Hauts, Des Bas" – 2:24 
 "Sunshine" – 3:23 
 "C'est Pas Comme Ca" – 2:35
 "Little Hily" – 3:04
 "Petit Detail" – 3:02
 "Sex Baby Sex" – 2:42
 "Beggin' Me To Stay" – 2:19
 "Tu Respires" – 3:45
 "Taboo" – 2:50
 "Girl" – 3:11
 "Monday to Sunday" (re-release bonus track)
 "Boys don't cry" (re-release bonus track)
 "Girl acoustic" (re-release bonus track)
 "Radio Song acoustic" ( re-release bonus track)
 "Shake" (re-release bonus track)

Personnel 

Jennifer Ayache, aka Jenn. – vocals
Patrice Focone, aka Pat. – guitar, backing vocals
Michel Giovannetti, aka Mitch. – guitar
François Even, aka Küntz. – bass, backing vocals
Guillaume Roussé, aka Gul. – drums

2004 albums
Superbus (band) albums
Mercury Records albums